In probability theory and statistics, the F-distribution or F-ratio, also known as Snedecor's F distribution or the Fisher–Snedecor distribution (after Ronald Fisher and George W. Snedecor) is a continuous probability distribution that arises frequently as the null distribution of a test statistic, most notably in the analysis of variance (ANOVA) and other F-tests.

Definition

The F-distribution with d1 and d2 degrees of freedom is the distribution of

 

It can be shown to follow that the probability density function (pdf) for X is given by

 

for real x > 0. Here  is the beta function. In many applications, the parameters d1 and d2 are positive integers, but the distribution is well-defined for positive real values of these parameters.

The cumulative distribution function is

where I is the regularized incomplete beta function.

The expectation, variance, and other details about the F(d1, d2) are given in the sidebox; for d2 > 8, the excess kurtosis is

The k-th moment of an F(d1, d2) distribution exists and is finite only when 2k < d2 and it is equal to

  

The F-distribution is a particular parametrization of the beta prime distribution, which is also called the beta distribution of the second kind.

The characteristic function is listed incorrectly in many standard references (e.g.,). The correct expression  is

where U(a, b, z) is the confluent hypergeometric function of the second kind.

Characterization
A random variate of the F-distribution with parameters  and   arises as the ratio of two appropriately scaled chi-squared variates:

where

Equivalently, the random variable of the F-distribution may also be written

This is the context in which the F-distribution most generally appears in F-tests: where the null hypothesis is that two independent normal variances are equal, and the observed sums of some appropriately selected squares are then examined to see whether their ratio is significantly incompatible with this null hypothesis.

Properties and related distributions 
If  (Gamma distribution) are independent, then 
If  (Beta distribution) then 
Equivalently, if , then .
If , then  has a beta prime distribution: .
If  then  has the chi-squared distribution 
 is equivalent to the scaled Hotelling's T-squared distribution .
If  then .
If  — Student's t-distribution — then: 
F-distribution is a special case of type 6 Pearson distribution
If  then  (Fisher's z-distribution)
The noncentral F-distribution simplifies to the F-distribution if .
The doubly noncentral F-distribution simplifies to the F-distribution if 
 F-distribution is an instance of ratio distributions

See also 

 Beta prime distribution
 Chi-square distribution
 Chow test
 Gamma distribution
 Hotelling's T-squared distribution
 Wilks' lambda distribution
 Wishart distribution

References

External links 
Table of critical values of the F-distribution
Earliest Uses of Some of the Words of Mathematics: entry on F-distribution contains a brief history
Free calculator for F-testing

Continuous distributions
Analysis of variance